Poienari is a commune in Neamț County, Western Moldavia, Romania. It is composed of three villages: Bunghi, Poienari, and Săcăleni. It included five other villages until 2004, when they were split off to form Pâncești Commune.

References

Communes in Neamț County
Localities in Western Moldavia